Veldhuis is a Dutch toponymic surname meaning "field house". Variant forms are Te(r) Veldhuis, (Van) Veldhuizen, Velthuijs and Velthuis.  Notable people with the surname include:

Jan G.F. Veldhuis (born 1938), Dutch academic
Lex Veldhuis (born 1983), Dutch poker player
Marleen Veldhuis (born 1979), Dutch swimmer
Menno Veldhuis (born 1974), Dutch artist

Variants:
Jacob ter Veldhuis (born 1951), Dutch composer
Mario Gerardo Piattini Velthuis (born 1966), Argentinian computer scientist
Max Velthuijs (1923–2005), Dutch children's book illustrator and writer

See also
Velthuis, an ASCII transliteration scheme for the Sanskrit developed by Frans Velthuis (born ca. 1949)
Veldhuizen (disambiguation)

References

Dutch-language surnames
Toponymic surnames